Don Berry may refer to:

 Don Berry (author) (1931–2001), American artist and author
 Don Berry (golfer), see Minnesota State Open
 Don Berry (statistician) (born 1940), American statistician
 Don "Red" Barry (1912–1980), American actor